Mamadou Diawara (born 26 July 1989) is a French footballer who plays as a forward.

Club career
A product of Clermont Foot youth academy, he joined the Portuguese team Belenenses in 2012 on a free transfer.

External links

Mamadou Diawara at Footballdatabase

1989 births
Living people
Sportspeople from Clermont-Ferrand
Association football forwards
French footballers
C.F. Os Belenenses players
C.R.D. Libolo players
Muaither SC players
Mesaimeer SC players
Al-Markhiya SC players
Qatari Second Division players
Cypriot Second Division players
Expatriate footballers in Cyprus
Expatriate footballers in Portugal
Expatriate footballers in Qatar
Akritas Chlorakas players